"Beyond the Sea" is the English-language version of the French song "La Mer" by Charles Trenet, popularized by Bobby Darin in 1959. While the French original was an ode to the sea, Jack Lawrence – who composed the English lyrics – turned it into a love song.

Versions

"Beyond the Sea" has been recorded by many artists, but Bobby Darin's version released in late 1959 is the best known by many, reaching No. 6 on the Billboard Hot 100, No. 15 on the US R&B Chart, and No. 8 in the UK Singles Chart. in early 1960.

Before Bobby Darin's version, two instrumental recordings reached the Top 40 of the Billboard Hot 100. Benny Goodman's version charted in 1948, and was featured in the Cary Grant/Betsy Drake romantic comedy Every Girl Should Be Married. Roger Williams' recording reached No. 37 in 1955.

The first recording of "Beyond the Sea" was by Harry James and His Orchestra on December 22, 1947, and the first recording of "La Mer" was by French jazz musician Roland Gerbeau in December 1945.

American R&B singer George Benson recorded an R&B version of the song under the title "Beyond The Sea (La Mer)." It was released on Warner Bros. This version entered the UK Singles Chart on 20 April 1985. It peaked at no. 60 and remained on the chart for three weeks.

References

External links
"Beyond The Sea". - Jack Lawrence Website.
Official Bobby Darin fansite
Second Hand Songs: La Mer / Beyond the Sea page

Songs about oceans and seas
1959 singles
1960 singles
1985 singles
Songs with lyrics by Jack Lawrence
Songs written by Charles Trenet
Bobby Darin songs
Benny Goodman songs
Robbie Williams songs
Atco Records singles
Pixar songs
1945 songs

no:La mer (sang)